The AEC 761T was a two-axle double deck trolleybus chassis manufactured by AEC. Based on the AEC Q-type bus chassis, only five were built; a demonstrator that was later purchased by Bradford, one in Southend-on-Sea and three exported to Sydney, Australia.

References

761
Trolleybuses
Vehicles introduced in 1933